Branchophantis is a genus of moths belonging to the family Tortricidae.

Species
Branchophantis chrysoschista  Meyrick, 1938

References

 , 1938, Trans. R. Soc. Lond. 87: 512.
 , 2005, World catalogue of insects volume 5 Tortricidae

External links
tortricidae.com

Chlidanotini
Taxa named by Edward Meyrick
Tortricidae genera